Saugeen Hunting Grounds 60A is a First Nations reserve in Bruce County, Ontario. It is one of the reserves of the Saugeen First Nation.

References

External links
 Canada Lands Survey System

Ojibwe reserves in Ontario
Communities in Bruce County
Unceded territories in Ontario
Saugeen First Nation